Li Na was the two-time defending champion, but retired from professional tennis on 19 September 2014.
First-seeded Simona Halep won the title, defeating Timea Bacsinszky in the final, 6–2, 6–2.

Seeds

Draw

Finals

Top half

Bottom half

Qualifying

Seeds

Qualifiers

Qualifying draw

First qualifier

Second qualifier

Third qualifier

Fourth qualifier

References
 Main draw
 Qualifying draw

WTA Shenzhen Open
2015 Singles